Julie Leclerc (born Chantal Séloron, 11 July 1945) is a French radio and television host.

Career
Leclerc was born in Saint-Étienne. Her father was an engineer and her mother a housewife. She studied in Lyon where she obtained a degree in art history.

After a season at RMC where she hosted the Julien et Julie show alongside Thierry Le Luron and Julien Lepers, she became one of the "voices" of Europe 1 radio station. Although she was replaced by Céline Da Costa in 2018, she remains Nicolas Canteloup's voice partner during his columns.

Private life 
She has been married to journalist Gérard Leclerc since 1981.

References 

Living people
French journalists
1949 births